Walmgate is a street in the city centre of York, in England. During the Medieval period, the street was the site of a seafissh and cattle market. Walmgate Bar, was involved in the Siege of York in 1644, during the First English Civil War. During the 20th century, many of the older buildings were cleared away and newer structures put up.

History

The street lay outside Roman Eboracum, and although it was crossed by a Roman road, evidence of occupation in the period is limited to two wharfs on the River Foss, and some burials.  The road appears to have developed in the Viking Jorvik period, during which it mostly hosted industrial and commercial uses.

The street was first mentioned in about 1080, as "Walbegate", suggesting it may be named after an individual called "Walba".  Walmgate Bar, the gate at the south-east end of the street, was built before 1155, but the section of the York city walls enclosing the street was built later: permission to construct this section of the walls was granted in 1267, and they were not completed until 1505.

By 1200, Walmgate was an important street, with four churches: St Denys, St Margaret, St Mary and St Peter-le-Willows, of which the first two still survive.  The Haberdashers' Hall was built on the street, as were large houses for the Percy and Neville families.  Many of the boundaries between building plots date from this period.  The area around St Margaret's church became known for fullers.

A seafish market was held on the street in the Mediaeval period.  In 1590, a cattle market was established, held every second Thursday, and from 1632, an annual cattle fair was also held.  By the 19th-century, it was causing serious congestion on the street, and in 1826 was moved to a dedicated cattle market outside the walls.

Walmgate Bar was the focus of the Siege of York in 1644, and some buildings on the street were damaged, although most of the destruction occurred outside the city walls.

In the 1840s, many immigrants from Ireland moved to Walmgate, and by the end of the decade, it and the surrounding streets and alleys housed half of the population of the whole city.  Overcrowding and poverty were rife.  St George's Catholic church was built a short distance from the road.  The street also became known for its pubs, peaking in 1901 with 20 on the street.  There was also some industry: the Victoria Iron Foundry and Walker Foundry (who made the York Minster Lamp Standard around 1860), Caroline Place linen mill, and a brewery.

Many buildings on the street were demolished as part of slum clearance schemes in the 20th-century, and since 1950, some council flats have been built.  Nikolaus Pevsner described the street as "depressing" in 1972, but by 1995, David Neave described it as "improved... most of the waste spaces have been filled, but there is still much to be done".  It is currently lined with a mix of independent shops, pubs and restaurants, offices and housing.

Layout and architecture

The street runs south-east, from Foss Bridge over the River Foss, continuing the route of Fossgate.  At the other end, it runs through Walmgate Bar, then ends at the city's inner ring road, at the junction of Lawrence Street, Barbican Road and Foss Islands Road.  Merchantgate, Dennis Street, St Denys Road, George Street, Margaret Street, and Hope Street all lead off the south-west side of the road, while Hurst's Yard, Paver Lane, and Navigation Road lead off the north-east side.

Notable buildings on the north-east side include Dorothy Wilson's Hospital, built in 1812; the 18th-century houses at 6, 8, 24 and 26-28 Walmgate; The Watergate Inn pub; a 15th-century timber-framed building at 32 Walmgate; 34 Walmgate, built about 1700; 68-70 Walmgate, and a warehouse behind 72 Walmgate, also of 18th-century origin; St Margaret's Church, now the National Centre for Early Music; and the Bretgate Flats, built in 1979, and described by Neave as "most successful".  On the south-west side are the 15th-century Red Lion pub, now often described as lying on Merchantgate; the 18th-century 9 and 11 Walmgate; 19 Walmgate, with a 16th-century wall; 23 and 25 Walmgate, both of 17th-century origin; 35-37 Walmgate, built in the 16th-century; the 15th-century 77 Walmgate; St Denys' Church; and Bowes Morrell House, built about 1400.

References

External links

Streets in York